Gaius Fabricius Luscinus Monocularis ("the one-eyed"), son of Gaius, was said to have been the first of the Fabricii to move to ancient Rome, his family originating from Aletrium.

In 284 BC he was one of the ambassadors to Tarentum, successfully keeping peace, and was elected consul in 282 BC where he saved the Greek city Thurii from the Lucanians. After the Romans were defeated by Pyrrhus at Heraclea, Fabricius negotiated peace terms with Pyrrhus and perhaps the ransom and exchange of prisoners; Plutarch reports that Pyrrhus was impressed by his inability to bribe Fabricius, and released the prisoners even without a ransom. Fabricius was consul a second time in 278 BC, and once again successful against the Samnites, Lucanians and Bruttians. He also defeated Tarentum's army after Pyrrhus' departure from Italy to Sicily.

Fabricius was elected censor in 275 BC.

The tales of Fabricius are the standard ones of austerity and incorruptibility, similar to those told of Curius Dentatus, and Cicero often cites them together; it is difficult to make out a true personality behind the virtues.  On the other hand, Valerius Maximus says that he and his co-consul/co-censor Quintus Aemilius Papus kept "silver in the[ir] homes... Each of them had a dish for the gods and a salt cellar, but Fabricius was more elegant because he chose to put a little pedestal of horn under his dish." [Valerius Maximus, Chapter Four "Poverty" 4.3]

In the Purgatorio of Dante's Divine Comedy, Canto XX depicted Fabricius as an example of virtue opposing Avarice, as the Pilgrim and Virgil trek through the realm of Purgatory, also galvanizing the connection between poverty and asceticism. They say his principles were so deeply embedded within his character that he suffered intense impoverishment, and that he died a pauper and had to be buried by the state. A quote wailed by a mysterious voice in Canto XX 24-27 reveals this: "O Good Fabricius, you who chose to live with virtue in your poverty, rather than live in luxury with vice."

References

 Smith, William. "FABRICIUS" Dictionary of Greek and Roman Biography and Mythology (1870).
 Maximus, Valerius Memorable Deeds and Sayings: One Thousand Tales From Ancient Rome Indianapolis: Hackett, 2004. 361 pp. 

Roman censors
Luscinus, Gaius
3rd-century BC Roman consuls
Ancient Roman diplomats
Pyrrhic War
Characters in Book VI of the Aeneid
3rd-century BC diplomats